The first term of Arnold Schwarzenegger as governor of California began on November 17, 2003, and ended on January 3, 2007. Campaigning for Governor of California as a member of the Republican Party, Schwarzenegger was elected on October 7, 2003, defeating incumbent Democratic governor Gray Davis in the California gubernatorial recall election. In the first year of his first term as governor, Schwarzenegger proposed deep cuts in the state budget and was met with opposition in the California State Legislature. When San Francisco started granting same-sex marriage licenses at the behest of mayor Gavin Newsom, the governor ordered state attorney general Bill Lockyer to intervene in the matter and vetoed legislation that would have legalized same-sex marriage. Because of their opposition to his budget cuts, Schwarzenegger controversially called his opponents in the legislature girlie men. At the 2004 Republican National Convention, Schwarzenegger gave a speech endorsing the reelection of George W. Bush as President of the United States.

In his State of the State address in 2005, Schwarzenegger proposed a redistricting reform that would have retired judges drawing new districts for the state. The first executions of Schwarzenegger's term occurred in 2005 with Donald Beardslee in January and Stanley Williams in December, which drew opposition from opponents of capital punishment and his native country of Austria. In June, the governor called for a special election in an effort to pass several of his proposed reforms. However, the voters ultimately rejected all of Schwarzenegger's propositions.

Schwarzenegger started off 2006 by apologizing for holding the special election, which had cost the state money, and proposed a centrist agenda moving forward. The governor opposed the federal government's effort to build fencing on the Mexico–United States border and likened it to the Berlin Wall. In 2006, Schwarzenegger made several efforts to address global warming by signing the Global Warming Solutions Act of 2006 and negotiating the creation of a carbon emissions trading market with British Prime Minister Tony Blair. By year's end, the governor called on the federal government to give a deadline for the withdrawal of U.S. troops from Iraq.

Election 

On April 10, 2003, Schwarzenegger met with President George W. Bush's senior advisor Karl Rove in the White House. In an autobiography, Schwarzenegger wrote that Rove told him the recall election in California would not happen and introduced him to then-national security advisor Condoleezza Rice, who was Rove's pick for California governor in 2006. On August 6, Schwarzenegger announced on The Tonight Show with Jay Leno that he would run for governor in the recall election. He was soon called "The Governator" by the media. It was reported by Reuters that Schwarzenegger's advisors asked television networks not to air any of his films during the election campaign, lest any of the other gubernatorial candidates invoke federal equal-time regulations and demand similar amounts of free airtime.

On August 13, Schwarzenegger appointed Berkshire Hathaway chairman Warren Buffett as his senior financial and economic adviser and Bob White, who was the chief of staff to Governor Pete Wilson, as a top political adviser. Patricia Clarey and Martin Wilson, who were also Wilson aides, were hired to handle the day-to-day operations of the campaign. In an interview with Time that was published on August 18, Schwarzenegger said he was pro-choice. However, his campaign website said he was opposed to partial-birth abortion and in favor of parental notification.

At a campaign event at California State University, Long Beach on September 3, Schwarzenegger was the target of an egging and later joked that he needed bacon to go with the egg. On the same day, Schwarzenegger skipped a debate attended by five gubernatorial candidates. On September 24, Schwarzenegger participated in a debate with four other candidates, including Arianna Huffington, and was called the "Arnold and Arianna Show" because of the verbal exchanges between the two. On October 1, Schwarzenegger laid out his plan for the first hundred days of his governorship, promising steps to freeze spending and audit the state budget, streamlining educational programs, rolling back pension increases for state employees, and repealing a law allowing illegal immigrants to receive state driver's licenses.

On October 2, the Los Angeles Times published an article with six women alleging that Schwarzenegger touched them in a sexual manner without their consent. The New York Times soon published an article about verbatim excerpts from a 1997 book proposal by George Butler in which Schwarzenegger allegedly said, "I admired Hitler, for instance, because he came from being a little man with almost no formal education up to power. And I admire him for being such a good public speaker." On the next day, Schwarzenegger acknowledged his behavior and apologized in San Diego, "Those people that I have offended, I want to say to them that I am deeply sorry about that and I apologize because that's not what I'm trying to do". However, he stated that he did not remember making comments about admiring Hitler and called him a "disgusting villain". In an October 6 interview with Peter Jennings, Schwarzenegger said he was pro-abortion and pro-gay rights, but he also said that he believed in the Second Amendment and the Brady Bill.

On October 7, Governor Gray Davis was successfully recalled and Schwarzenegger was elected with a plurality of the votes. In his victory speech, Schwarzenegger promised the people of California that he would not fail them. On October 16, Schwarzenegger met with president George W. Bush in southern California. In a news conference, Schwarzenegger said he tried to use their meeting to "create a great relationship with the White House" rather than ask Bush for specific favors. On October 22, Schwarzenegger made his first hire by naming Patricia Clarey as his chief of staff. On October 30, Schwarzenegger met with Vice President Dick Cheney at the White House. He also met with FEMA director Michael D. Brown to discuss disaster relief while there were active wildfires in California and with Dianne Feinstein, the U.S. Senator from California, to express his support for an extension of the assault weapons ban.

Schwarzenegger's energy advisers said on November 1 they would bring a fresh approach to deregulating the electric industry. On November 3, Schwarzenegger appointed former Los Angeles mayor Richard Riordan as education secretary and Donna Arduin as finance director. On November 4, Schwarzenegger named four people to his staff: Marybel Batjer as cabinet secretary, Rob Stutzman as communications director, Bonnie Reiss as a senior advisor, and Peter Siggins as legal secretary. On November 10, Schwarzenegger announced that Larry King Live producer Margita Thompson would be his press secretary, Terry Tamminen was named the secretary of the California Environmental Protection Agency, James Branham as EPA undersecretary, and Maureen Gorsen as EPA deputy secretary for law enforcement and general counsel.

First term

2003–2004 

On November 17, 2003, Schwarzenegger was sworn in as the 38th Governor of California. Within minutes after being inaugurated, Schwarzenegger's first action as governor was restoring the vehicle registration fee to 0.65 percent of a car's value, which was raised to 2 percent on October 1. On November 21, Schwarzenegger attended the funeral of Burbank police officer Matthew Pavelka, who was fatally shot on November 15. On December 9, Schwarzenegger announced that there was no investigation needed into the groping allegations against him. On the same day, stuntwoman Rhonda Miller sued Schwarzenegger for libel after his campaign emailed reporters a link to a criminal court website and search Rhonda Miller. The website indicated a Rhonda Miller had a criminal record for offences which included prostitution, forgery, and drug dealing, but the stuntwoman's legal team said that the Rhonda Miller with the record was a different person.

It was announced on December 12 that Schwarzenegger and the California State Legislature reached an agreement that put on the ballot a bond issue to finance as much as $15 billion in debt and a constitutional spending limit. On December 18, Schwarzenegger declared a fiscal crisis and said he would bypass the legislature to impose $150 million in spending cuts. After a 6.5 magnitude earthquake on December 21, Schwarzenegger visited Paso Robles on December 23 and declared a state of emergency in San Luis Obispo County.

On January 6, 2004, Schwarzenegger gave his first State of the State address in which he warned voters to expect deep budget cuts and urged them to support $15 billion in bonds. In the budget proposal that he presented on January 9, Schwarzenegger's plan was to cut spending by more than $4.6 billion, with the largest reduction, roughly $2.7 billion, coming from health and human services programs. Acknowledging that the reductions would be painful to many of the poorest Californians, Schwarzenegger said "irresponsible" spending by his predecessor forced his hand. On January 24, Schwarzenegger; NASA administrator Sean O'Keefe; and former Vice President Al Gore were at the Jet Propulsion Laboratory in Pasadena, California, to observe the landing of Opportunity on Mars.

Terri Carbaugh, his spokesperson, said on February 16 that Schwarzenegger was planning on turning the state capitol's courtyard into a "smoking plaza". On February 20, Schwarzenegger ordered California Attorney General Bill Lockyer to intervene immediately to stop San Francisco from granting marriage licenses to same-sex couples. On the March 3 episode of The Tonight Show with Jay Leno, Schwarzenegger said it would be "fine with [him]" if Californians changed the state's family code to allow for same-sex marriages. He also said he opposed a constitutional amendment supported by George W. Bush that would ban them. On March 5, Schwarzenegger went to Columbus, Ohio, to attend the Arnold Sports Festival.

Schwarzenegger visited Israel on May 2, where he met Prime Minister Ariel Sharon and attended the groundbreaking ceremony for the Simon Wiesenthal Centre's Museum of Tolerance. On May 3, Schwarzenegger met King Abdullah II of Jordan in a hastily arranged visit following criticism from Arab Americans that his trip to the Middle East had excluded a meeting with Arabs. On June 11, Schwarzenegger attended the funeral of the late President Ronald Reagan. Schwarzenegger signed agreements with five Native American tribes on June 21 that administration officials said would provide $275 million a year for the state's general fund—representing about 15 percent of the tribes' profits. On July 17, Schwarzenegger called state legislators girlie men and called upon voters to "terminate" them at the polls in November if they didn't pass his $103 billion budget. Amid Democratic criticism, Schwarzenegger's spokesperson said on July 19 that no apology would be forthcoming.

On July 31, Schwarzenegger signed a $78.8 billion budget, which was a $32 billion reduction over five years. On August 16, Schwarzenegger said he was considering giving weightlifting equipment back to prisoners, who had been barred from using weights since 1997. Schwarzenegger gave a speech at the Republican National Convention on August 31 at Madison Square Garden and closed by saying, "George W. Bush has worked hard to protect and preserve the American dream for all of us. And that's why I say, send him back to Washington for four more years." On September 13, Schwarzenegger signed the .50 Caliber BMG Regulation Act, which banned the manufacturing, sale, distribution, and importation of .50 BMG rifles, making California the first U.S. state to do so. Schwarzenegger vetoed a bill on September 22 that would have given as many as two million illegal immigrants California driver's licenses, saying the measure failed to provide sufficient security provisions at a time of heightened terrorism fears.

Schwarzenegger signed a bill on September 28 that banned mercury in vaccines for young children and pregnant women, making California the second U.S. state after Iowa to do so. On September 30, Schwarzenegger vetoed two bills—one that would have required the California Department of Health Services to set up a website to help consumers compare prices among Canadian pharmacies and buy medicines from them and another bill that would have required California to monitor foreign suppliers of prescription drugs to make sure they met American standards for purity, handling and packaging. Schwarzenegger warned state voters against Proposition 70, which would allow the expansion of casinos in return for payments on par with state corporate taxes, saying, "The Indians are ripping us off." On October 18, endorsed Propositions 62 and 71, the former of which would establish open primary elections and the latter of which would authorize the sale of $3 billion in bonds and the creation of a state institute that would award grants to stem cell researchers.

At a rally in Los Angeles on October 28, Schwarzenegger joined three former California governors, including his predecessor Gray Davis, to voice his opposition to Proposition 66. On October 29, Schwarzenegger appeared at a campaign rally for George W. Bush in Columbus, Ohio, saying, "I am here to pump you up to re-elect President George W. Bush." Schwarzenegger travelled to Japan on November 10 and met Prime Minister Junichiro Koizumi on November 12, who remarked that the governor was more popular in Japan than George W. Bush. On November 13, U.S. Ambassador Howard Baker and the U.S. Embassy Marine Security Guard detachment invited Schwarzenegger to the Marine Corps ball at New Sanno Hotel and said, "It's great to be here with the greatest of the great, and the strongest of the strong. I am honored to join you tonight, to celebrate the 229th anniversary of the birth of the Marine Corps." On December 7, Schwarzenegger was giving a speech in Long Beach at an annual conference celebrating women's contributions to the state when he was interrupted by protesting nurses who he called "special interests"

2005 
In his State of the State address on January 5, 2005, Schwarzenegger proposed turning over the drawing of the state's political map to a panel of retired judges. On January 12, Schwarzenegger went to La Conchita, California, after a deadly landslide on January 10, and told residents, "In the past few days, we have seen the power of nature cause damage and despair, but we will match that power with our own resolve." Schwarzenegger allowed the execution of Donald Beardslee to proceed on January 19, which was the first execution during his tenure as governor and the first in three years.

On March 6, Schwarzenegger announced that he wanted to ban all sales of junk food in California schools and fill vending machines with fresh fruits, vegetables and milk. Schwarzenegger declared April 24 a "Day of Remembrance of the Armenian genocide" to the chagrin of the Ankara Chamber of Commerce, an umbrella organization grouping some 300 Ankara-based unions and businesses. In a radio interview on April 28, Schwarzenegger praised the Minutemen campaign that used armed volunteers to stop illegal immigrants from crossing into the U.S, which drew condemnation from Democrats, immigrants' rights groups, the Mexican government, and some Republicans. On April 30, Schwarzenegger appointed Alan Bersin, the superintendent of the San Diego Unified School District, as the education secretary.

On May 26, Schwarzenegger travelled to San Jose, California, to fill a pothole dug by city crews just a few hours before, as part of an attempt to dramatize his efforts to increase money for transportation projects. Schwarzenegger announced on June 13 that a special election would occur on November 8 for voters to decide on a package of government reforms on how Californians spend state tax dollars and elect their politicians. While giving a commencement speech at Santa Monica College on June 14, Schwarzenegger faced boos, chants, turned backs, and signs of protest to his policies on education funding. On September 15, Schwarzenegger signed bills that banned the sale of sodas in high schools and set fat, sugar, and calorie standards for all food, except cafeteria lunches, sold in public schools.

On September 29, Schwarzenegger vetoed 52 bills that would have legalized same-sex marriage, raised the minimum wage, gave residents access to cheaper prescriptions in Canada, created greater oversight of the state's $3 billion stem cell research program, and other actions. Schwarzenegger signed a bill on September 30 that tripled damages celebrities could win from paparazzi if they were assaulted during a shoot and denied the photographers profits from any pictures taken in an altercation. On October 7, Schwarzenegger signed legislation to outlaw the sale to teenagers of electronic games featuring reckless mayhem and explicit sexuality. In the special election on November 8, all four of Schwarzenegger's signature ballot proposals (Propositions 74, 75, 76, and 77) were rejected by the voters as well as four other initiatives. After learning that at least two of his initiatives had failed, Schwarzenegger told supporters, "Tomorrow, we begin anew. I feel the same tonight as that night two years ago...You know with all my heart, I want to do the right thing for the people of California."

On November 13, Schwarzenegger participated in a promotional event for the Special Olympics, founded by his mother-in-law, Eunice Kennedy Shriver. Schwarzenegger attended an energy conference on November 16, where he urged diplomats and business leaders to forge ties that will reduce the world's dependence on oil and increase energy efficiency. On November 19, Schwarzenegger wrapped up his trip to China in Hong Kong, where he unveiled an anti-piracy ad with Jackie Chan. On November 25, Schwarzenegger said he would consider granting clemency to convicted killer and Crips co-founder Stanley Williams. On November 30, Schwarzenegger named Public Utilities Commissioner Susan Kennedy, a Democrat, as his new chief of staff, replacing Patricia Clarey. In a news conference, Schwarzenegger said, "[Kennedy is] a woman that is known as being a hardworking woman, dedicated, and is willing to work whatever it takes to get the job done."

In a closed-door meeting, Schwarzenegger met with lawyers of Stanley Williams and prosecutors with each side having thirty minutes to plead its case to the governor. Margita Thompson told reporters that Schwarzenegger's decision on whether to grant clemency to Williams would come as late as December 12. On December 9, Schwarzenegger nominated Carol Corrigan, a moderate Republican, to the state Supreme Court to fill the vacancy created by the departure of Janice Rogers Brown. Schwarzenegger denied Williams clemency on December 12, writing, "Stanley Williams insists he is innocent, and that he will not and should not apologize or otherwise atone for the murders of the four victims in this case. Without an apology and atonement for these senseless and brutal killings, there can be no redemption." After the U.S. Supreme Court refused to stay the execution, Williams was executed shortly after midnight at San Quentin State Prison on December 13.

In Austria, Schwarzenegger faced backlash over the execution on December 19 from left-wing councillors in Graz, who announced that they were seeking to strip him of his Austrian citizenship. Schwarzenegger sent a letter to Graz on December 19 demanding his name to be removed from a stadium that bore his name since 1997. He also wrote that he was revoking his permission for Graz to use his name in any advertising campaigns that promote the city. On December 26, Schwarzenegger's name was removed from the stadium.

2006 
On January 5, 2006, Schwarzenegger gave a State of the State address in which he apologized to the voters of California for sponsoring the costly special election and proposed a series of policies that represented a dramatic return to the political center. Schwarzenegger and his 12-year-old son Patrick were involved in a motorcycle accident near their Brentwood home on January 8. Both Schwarzeneggers were treated for cuts and bruises at St. John's Hospital in Santa Monica and released. On January 10, the Los Angeles Police Department said that Schwarzenegger did not have the proper endorsement on his California driver's license to operate a motorcycle. However, spokesperson Margita Thompson said the sidecar attached to the motorcycle made the bike a three-wheeled vehicle, which Schwarzenegger was entitled to drive with his regular Class C driver's license. On January 19, Santa Barbara judge Frank Ochoa overturned Schwarzenegger's decision to deny parole to inmate Frank Pintye, who was present when his friend beat a 69-year-old man with a tire iron and then set the man ablaze.

On April 23, Schwarzenegger said that building a 700-mile wall along the border with Mexico to deter illegal immigration would amount to "going back to the Stone Ages" and urged the federal government to use high-tech gear and more patrols to secure the nation's southern boundary. In leaked audio tapes, Schwarzenegger likened the proposed Mexico–United States border fence to the Berlin Wall in March, "We had the Berlin Wall; we had walls everywhere. But we always looked at the wall as kind of like the outside of the wall is the enemy. Are we looking at Mexico as the enemy? No, it's not. These are our trading partners." On May 2, Schwarzenegger told NFL commissioner Paul Tagliabue and a committee of eleven owners that he wanted two teams to play in Los Angeles. Schwarzenegger signed the Sustainable Oceans Act on May 26, which made California the first U.S. state to adopt comprehensive controls on future fish farming in its coastal waters.

On June 23, Schwarzenegger turned down a request from George W. Bush to more than double the number of California National Guard troops that would be deployed to the border, fearing the commitment could leave the state vulnerable if an earthquake or wildfire erupted. Reversing a decade of California policy, Schwarzenegger called for the construction of at least two more prisons and the addition of thousands of beds in existing facilities on June 26 to deal with what he called "dangerously overcrowded" prisons. On June 29, Schwarzenegger attended a fundraiser for Log Cabin Republicans, where he said, "I can't promise you that we will always be [of] the same mind, but I can promise you that I will always have an open mind."

After George W. Bush vetoed expanded federal funding of embryonic stem cell research on July 19, Schwarzenegger authorized a $150 million loan to fund California's stem cell institute on July 20. On July 31, Schwarzenegger and British Prime Minister Tony Blair agreed to create a market for the trading of carbon emissions, and share economic and scientific research on climate change and non-polluting technology. On August 25, Schwarzenegger settled a libel lawsuit with Anna Richardson, who claimed she was groped by him during a 2000 interview and later defamed by his aides during his 2003 campaign. After obtaining a six-minute recording, the Los Angeles Times published an article on September 8 writing that Schwarzenegger casually said that "black blood" mixed with "Latino blood" equals "hot" when debating Assemblywoman Bonnie Garcia's ethnicity with Susan Kennedy. Even though Garcia said she was not offended, Schwarzenegger apologized for the comment.

On September 15, Schwarzenegger signed into law a bill that made California the fourth U.S. state to ban motorists from holding cell phones while driving. Schwarzenegger met with New York City mayor Michael Bloomberg in Sunnyvale, California, on September 21 to discuss the state's sustainability initiatives. On September 27, Schwarzenegger signed into law the Global Warming Solutions Act of 2006 and said the effort kicked off "a bold new era of environmental protection". Schwarzenegger proclaimed a state of emergency on October 4 and said, "Our prisons are now beyond maximum capacity, and we must act immediately and aggressively to resolve this issue." He also caused controversy that day when he said that Mexican immigrants "try to stay Mexican". On October 16, Schwarzenegger met Bloomberg again in New York City and attended a fundraiser with him that included New York Governor George Pataki, former U.S. Senator Al D'Amato, former Massachusetts Governor Bill Weld, and financier Ira Rennert.

On November 2, Schwarzenegger called for a deadline to withdraw American troops from Iraq. Schwarzenegger met with Mexican President Vicente Fox on November 9 to discuss immigration and trade issues and to encourage further efforts on both sides to control greenhouse gases. On November 15, Schwarzenegger legislative aide Richard Costigan left the job to return to his old profession as a lobbyist. Margita Thompson announced on November 16 that she was leaving her job as press secretary in December. Alan Bersin resigned as well from his job as education secretary. On December 6, Orange County deputy district attorney Sheila Hanson was appointed by Schwarzenegger to be an Orange County Superior Court judge. During the Christmas weekend, Schwarzenegger suffered a fractured right femur while skiing with his family in Sun Valley, Idaho. He underwent surgery on December 26 in Los Angeles and was released from the hospital on December 30.

See also 
 Second term of Arnold Schwarzenegger as governor of California
 Opinion polling on the Arnold Schwarzenegger governorship

References 

2000s in California
Arnold Schwarzenegger
Schwarzenegger, Arnold
Schwarzenegger 1